Madhumati is a 2013 Indian Telugu-language film written and directed by Raaj Shreedhar starring Udaya Bhanu and Vishnu Priyan.

Plot
Bhanu portrays a sex worker in this film.

Cast
 Udaya Bhanu as Madhumati
 Vishnupriyan as Karthik
 Telangana Shakuntala as Karthik's grandma
 Diksha
 Seetha
 Prabhas Sreenu
 Venu
 Bustop Koteshwar Rao
 Nagabhairava Arun Kumar

Soundtrack

References 

2013 films
2010s Telugu-language films
Films about prostitution in India